SIG Combibloc Group AG, originally founded as Schweizerische Industrie Gesellschaft (German for Swiss Industrial Company; in French, as Société Industrielle Suisse; and, in Italian, as Societá Industriale Svizzera), and later known as SIG Holding AG, is a company currently active in the Packaging industry but used to participate in firearms and railcar manufacturing as well.

In 2007, SIG Holding AG was acquired by Rank Group Limited, the private investment company of New Zealand businessman Graeme Hart, and operated under its subsidiary, Reynolds Group Holdings Ltd., which, in March 2015, announced completion of its sale of SIG to ONEX Corporation of Canada. In 2018, SIG Combibloc secured a $1.101 billion loan, with Barclays Bank acting as the administrative agent on the transaction.

The SIG Combibloc Group shares are listed on SIX Swiss Exchange and it is a component of the SMI MID index.

History
The schweizerische Waggonfabrik ("Swiss Wagon Factory") was founded in 1853 by Friedrich Peyer im Hof, Heinrich Moser, and Johann Conrad Neher. From 1854, it produced railway cars for the emerging Swiss railway companies. Friedrich Peyer was one of the directors of the Swiss Northeastern Railway, also founded in 1853. Their factory in Neuhausen am Rheinfall was originally powered by the nearby Rhine Falls and employed 150 workers, by the mid-1860s increased to 500 workers.

Firearms
They produced the Prélaz-Burnand 1859, invented by gunsmith Jean-Louis Joseph Prélaz and forestry inspector Colonel Ėdouard Burnand (father of Swiss painter Eugène Burnand). In 1860, the rifle won a competition held by the Swiss Federal Ministry of Defence, resulting in a contract to produce 30,000 pieces. This rifle was adapted as the M1863.

Upon receiving the contract to produce rifles, the company name was changed to reflect its new emphasis on machined production, becoming Schweizerische Industrie Gesellschaft (SIG); in English, Swiss Industrial Company; and, in French, Société Industrielle Suisse.

SIG produced other firearms, including Mondragón Rifle, which was produced between 1908 and 1910. The SIG P210 pistol was developed in 1937 based on the French Modèle 1935 pistol, and was adopted by the Swiss military in 1949 as the "Pistole 49". This pistol's frame design incorporates external rails that fit closely with the slide, thus eliminating play in the mechanism during firing. The P210 was noted for its good accuracy.  The Petter-Browning patent was a refinement—and John Moses Browning's last design—of the Browning Hi-Power (P35).

In 1975, the Swiss military replaced the P210 with the P220, dubbed the "Pistole 75", which was the first product of a partnership with J.P. Sauer & Sohn. In a 1984 bidding contest to provide more than 300,000 sidearms to the US military, the SIG Sauer P226 was defeated by Beretta's 92FS which was awarded the contract for the M9 pistol. The SIG SG 510, or Sturmgewehr 57, battle rifle was produced by SIG from 1957 to 1983. Its appearance was vaguely similar to the German MG34 light machine-gun, due to its ventilated barrel jacket. It employed roller-delayed blowback, as used on the CETME/HK rifles. The only general purpose machine gun produced by SIG was the SIG 710-3, which is based on the MG42.

During the 1970s, SIG purchased both Hämmerli and J.P. Sauer and Sohn, resulting in the formation of SIG Sauer.  Due to Swiss restrictions on the export of military weapons, SIG entered into a relationship with the German company J.P. Sauer & Sohn, in order to give SIG access to the global firearms market.

In January 1985, SIGARMS was established in Tyson's Corner, Virginia, where its handgun models P220 and P230 were imported into the US from Sig Sauer in Germany. In 2007, SIGARMS changed its name to SIG Sauer. SIG Arm's division was purchased in 2000 by L & O Holding, and is now known as SIG SAUER AG.

Railways
In the late 1970s, SIG was the designer and builder of  Toronto's newest streetcar, the CLRV L1. Only the first six CLRV cars were made by SIG (out of an order for 10, as the rest were cancelled for cost-saving measures). The remaining 190 L2 vehicles, along with 52 articulated variants, were made by Thunder Bay, Ontario-based Urban Transportation Development Corporation (UTDC), now a subsidiary of Bombardier Transportation, which had, in late 1991, negotiated a $17 million subsidy from the Ontario government for the purchase.

In the early 1980s, SIG was the designer and builder of the Utrecht sneltram trams. 27 were ordered and delivered in 1983. Replacement plans were commenced in 2016 and rolled out in two phases. Scheduled replacement began with first vehicles retired during 2017 - 2018 and final run in July 2020.

The tilting system of the SBB RABDe 500 was developed by SIG. The railway branch of SIG was sold in 1995 to Fiat Ferroviaria.

Packaging
The first packaging machines were produced in 1906 on behalf of the Lausanne-based company SAPAL (Société Anonyme des Plieuses Automatiques).

Most of SIG's earlier packaging equipment efforts were focused on small dry food items such as chocolates and candy. Following the 1982 FDA approval of hydrogen peroxide sterilization; on June 28, 1983, SIG acquired Doboy Packaging Machinery, Inc. of Wisconsin. SIG COMBIBLOC INC. was then incorporated on September 1, 1983, in Columbus, Ohio, where production commenced in 1984. In 1989, through the acquisition of PKL in Linnich, Germany, SIG entered the field of aseptic carton liquid packaging, later known as SIG Combibloc.

In 2000, SIG concentrated solely on food and beverage packaging technology. Management directed revenues from the sales of SIG Sauer and Rocktools to acquire global businesses, including Krupp Kunstofftechnik (Corpoplast/Blowtec/Kautex brands) and HAMBA in Germany; Ryka Blow Molds in Canada; and a substantial portion of the Italian conglomerate SASIB. The food-related (dry) businesses were organized under the SIG Pack division, while the beverage-related (wet) businesses formed SIG Beverages. Aseptic liquid packaging remained separate under SIG Combibloc.

This strategy, however, was proven not to be effective; Difficulties integrating vastly different businesses and employee cultures resulted in operational execution issues. In particular, high-profile commissioning and installation failures at SIG Beverages in 2003 and 2004 ultimately resulted in significant financial losses. A refocusing towards primarily aseptics and PET blow-molding resulted in a high number of divestitures and plant closures. The former SASIB wet businesses Simonazzi, Alfa and Meyer/Mojonnier were sold to Tetra Laval in 2005, while HAMBA and Kautex and Blowtec were sold separately to private investor groups. The food packaging businesses were sold to Robert Bosch Verpackungstechnik in 2004. The former SASIB dry unit Stewart Systems (bakery products) was sold to UCA Group in 2004, then merged with AMF Bakery Systems in 2008. Laser-guided vehicle manufacturer  80, part of the 1999 SASIB acquisition, was sold back to its original Italian owners in 2004. The considerably slimmed-down SIG Beverages unit, manufacturer of PET bottle blow-molding machinery, was sold off to the German company Salzgitter AG in March 2008. This sale encompassed the subsidiaries Corpoplast, Asbofill, Plasmax and Moldtec.

SIG Combibloc
Today, SIG Combibloc focuses on aseptic packaging. In 2016, the company introduced Combibloc RS Composite, a composite structural inner layer which increases system stability and reduces the carbon footprint of carton packs. In 2017, SIG introduced the first individual QR codes with digital sourcing transparency, tailored for dairy product consumers.

See also

 TetraPak

References

External links

 
 SIG Group - LinkedIn

Rolling stock manufacturers of Switzerland
Tram manufacturers
Packaging companies of Switzerland
Firearm manufacturers of Switzerland
Neuhausen am Rheinfall
Onex Corporation
2007 mergers and acquisitions
2014 mergers and acquisitions
Swiss brands
Electric vehicle manufacturers of Switzerland
Companies listed on the SIX Swiss Exchange
SIG Sauer